Steve Webster (born 17 January 1975) is an English professional golfer.

Webster was born in Nuneaton, Warwickshire and was brought up in nearby Atherstone. He finished tied for 24th place in the 1995 Open Championship at St Andrews, winning the silver medal as low amateur ahead of Tiger Woods. He turned professional later that year.

Webster was medalist at the 1995 European Tour Qualifying School. He finished in 129th place on the Order of Merit in his rookie season, just missing out on retaining his playing privileges and forcing him to return to qualifying school, where he was again successful. Since 1997 he has made the top 100 on the Order of Merit every season, to comfortably retain his place on Europe's elite tour.

In 2005 Webster won his first European Tour title at the Telecom Italia Open, and finished a career best 29th on the Order of Merit. In 2007 he won his second European Tour event at the Portugal Masters.

Webster was a member of the winning Great Britain & Ireland team at the 2002 Seve Trophy and again in 2009.

Amateur wins
1992 McGregor Trophy
1993 Peter McEvoy Trophy

Professional wins (2)

European Tour wins (2)

European Tour playoff record (0–2)

Results in major championships

Note: Webster never played in the Masters Tournament or the U.S. Open.

LA = Low amateur
CUT = missed the half-way cut
"T" = tied

Results in World Golf Championships

"T" = Tied

Team appearances
Amateur
European Boys' Team Championship (representing England): 1994 (winners)
Jacques Léglise Trophy (representing Great Britain and Ireland): 1994 (winners)

Professional
Seve Trophy (representing Great Britain & Ireland): 2002 (winners), 2009 (winners)

References

External links

English male golfers
European Tour golfers
Sportspeople from Nuneaton
People from Sunningdale
1975 births
Living people